Parliamentary elections were held in Lithuania on 10 and 11 October 1922, electing 78 members of the First Seimas. They were the first elections held in Lithuania under the 1922 constitution, which had been adopted by the Constituent Assembly on 1 August 1922.

38 out of 78 seats were won by a bloc of parties led by the Christian Democrats, and they acquired both the positions of President and Prime Minister, occupied by Aleksandras Stulginskis and Ernestas Galvanauskas respectively. In both cases, however, the Christian Democrats were not supported by any party in the opposition and could only form a minority government. Unable to work with such a makeup, the First Seimas was dissolved on 12 March 1923.

Electoral system
The law on the conduct of Seimas elections was promulgated by the Constituent Assembly on 19 July 1922, and published in the official newspaper of the government, "Vyriausybės žinios" (Government News) on 27 July 1922. Elections were universal, free and secret, and all citizens of Lithuania, both men and women over 21 years old, were allowed to vote. Citizens 24 years old or older were allowed to stand for election.

The elections were held with party-list proportional representation, in nine multi-member constituencies. In practice, only six of the nine defined constituencies held elections, as Constituencies VII, VIII and IX were allocated to territories occupied by Poland during the Polish–Lithuanian War in 1920. Their centers were Vilnius, Lida and Hrodna respectively. Seats in constituencies were distributed by largest remainder method.

Parties and electoral groups (kuopa) were allowed to submit lists of candidates to constituencies, which had to be signed by at least fifty voters. As such, there was a large number of small electoral lists in every constituency. However, the method of calculating the distribution of seats in each constituency benefited larger parties, as such, the only non-party electoral group which managed to gain seats were lists submitted by the underground Communist Party of Lithuania.

Initially, voting was designed to take place only one day, but several days before the elections law was amended to allow two days of voting (with possibility of a third day of voting). Three days of voting took place in Kelmė.

Competing parties
The largest and most active electoral alliance in the election was the Christian Democratic Bloc, formed from the Lithuanian Christian Democratic Party and two satellite organizations - Labour Federation, which represented Catholic workers, and Farmers' Association, which represented Catholic peasantry. The Christian Democratic Bloc was strongly supported by the Lithuanian priesthood, which had a strong influence in the agrarian and less literate countryside, and numerous priests were a part of their electoral lists.

However, the Christian Democrats were isolated in the political arena. Historically, LKDP evolved from a different stream of the Lithuanian National Revival than all of their competitors - the Peasant Union, Social Democrats and Party of National Progress (later the Lithuanian Nationalist Union). All of them evolved from the secular nationalist newspaper Varpas, while the Christian Democrats evolved around the Catholic periodical Tėvynės sargas.

The alliance of the Peasant Union and Popular Socialist Party presented itself as socialist and campaigned for the lifting of martial law and secularization. Though the main targets of the criticism were Christian Democrats and National Progress, they were also in opposition to the Social Democrats. The Social Democrats presented their electoral campaign as the first step towards a peaceful socialist revolution and campaigned for a "Seimas of the workers". All political parties supported the land reforms put in place by the Constituent Assembly, and oftentimes argued that their competitors will be the ones to roll back the reform.

Separate electoral lists by the Polish, Jewish and Russian minorities also competed in the election.

Results

Aftermath
Though the Christian Democratic Bloc achieved a plurality of the seats, they were unable to form a majority coalition, nor did the opposition parties manage to unite against them. The next President and Prime Minister were thus elected via violations of electoral conduct. Protesting against the Christian Democrats, the opposition parties refused to participate in the election of Aleksandras Stulginskis and he was elected solely with Christian Democratic votes. Two governments led by independent politician Ernestas Galvanauskas were formed, but in both cases they were approved with 38 votes in favor and 38 votes against (2 members of the Seimas did not participate), which the opposition criticized as illegal.

The formed government was unstable and the First Seimas was dissolved on 12 March 1923.

References

 

Lithuanian parliamentary election
Parliamentary election
Lithuanian parliamentary election
Parliamentary elections in Lithuania